Texas County is a county located in the southern portion of the U.S. state of Missouri. As of the 2020 census, the population was 24,487. Its county seat is Houston. The county was organized in 1843 as Ashley County, changing its name in 1845 to Texas, after the Republic of Texas. The 2010 U.S. Census indicates that the county was the center of population for the United States.

History
Texas County was created in 1843 and named for William H. Ashley, the first lieutenant governor of Missouri. It was later organized on February 14, 1845, when it was also renamed for the Republic of Texas.

A seat of justice for the county was laid out in 1846 near the center of the county on Brushy Creek and named Houston for the first president of the Texas Republic. The historic Texas County Courthouse, built in 1932, was the county's sixth and now serves as the county administrative center. It was remodeled in 1977 and again in 2007. A new justice center was completed in 2008.

Rugged hills, springs, creeks, rivers and caves abound in Texas County. There have been many Native American mounds found in the county. Their paintings remain upon various bluffs over ancient campsites. The area was part of the 1808 Osage Native American land cession.

Pioneers came to Texas County in the 1820s from Virginia, Kentucky, Tennessee and the Carolinas and set up sawmills along the Big Piney River. Pioneers made a nice income rafting the timber down the Piney River toward St. Louis. Some  in the north and northwest part of the county is now part of the Mark Twain National Forest. Several acres in the southeast part of the county are part of the Ozark National Scenic Riverways Park.  Small family farms are still a major part of the landscape of the county. The population of the first Federal Census of Texas County in 1850 was 2,312 citizens.

The American Civil War period was a time of turmoil in Texas County. The populace was predominantly Southern. The courthouse was occupied during the war by the Union Army as headquarters. Houston was an important point on the route from federal headquarters in Springfield to headquarters in Rolla. Some skirmishes were fought here. Confederate soldiers stormed the town, burning every building.

On February 26, 2015, a gunman shot and killed seven people in several locations across the town of Tyrone. The suspect was later found dead of a self-inflicted gunshot wound. It was the worst mass murder in Texas County's history. Prior to the mass shooting, the county had an average of one homicide per year.

Geography
It is the largest county in Missouri by area.

Adjacent counties

Pulaski County (north)
Phelps County (north)
Dent County (northeast)
Shannon County (east)
Howell County (south)
Douglas County (southwest)
Wright County (west)
Laclede County (northwest)

Major highways
 U.S. Route 60
 U.S. Route 63
 Route 17
 Route 32
 Route 38
 Route 137

National protected areas
 Mark Twain National Forest (part)
 Ozark National Scenic Riverways (part)

Demographics

As of the census of 2000, there were 23,003 people, 9,378 households, and 6,647 families residing in the county. The population density was 21 people per square mile (8/km2).  There were 9,378 housing units at an average density of 9 per square mile (4/km2). The racial makeup of the county was 96.47% White, 0.21% Black or African American, 0.96% Native American, 0.34% Asian, 0.01% Pacific Islander, 0.19% from other races, and 1.81% from two or more races. Approximately 0.96% of the population were Hispanic or Latino of any race.

There were 9,378 households, out of which 30.80% had children under the age of 18 living with them, 58.10% were married couples living together, 8.90% had a female householder with no husband present, and 29.10% were non-families. 26.00% of all households were made up of individuals, and 13.20% had someone living alone who was 65 years of age or older. The average household size was 2.42 and the average family size was 2.89.

Age spread: 24.90% under the age of 18, 7.10% from 18 to 24, 24.90% from 25 to 44, 25.30% from 45 to 64, and 17.80% who were 65 years of age or older. The median age was 40 years. For every 100 females there were 93.50 males. For every 100 females age 18 and over, there were 90.10 males.

The median income for a household in the county was $29,260, and the median income for a family was $34,503. Males had a median income of $25,071 versus $17,126 for females. The per capita income for the county was $16,568. About 16.50% of families and 21.40% of the population were below the poverty line, including 29.10% of those under age 18 and 17.20% of those age 65 or over.

Religion
According to the Association of Religion Data Archives County Membership Report (2000), Texas County is a part of the Bible Belt with evangelical Protestantism being the majority religion. The most predominant denominations among residents in Texas County who adhere to a religion are Southern Baptists (77.46%), Christian Churches & Churches of Christ (20.65%), and National Association of Free Will Baptists (12.92%).

2020 Census

Politics

Local

The Republican Party mostly controls politics at the local level in Texas County. Republicans hold all but one of the elected positions in the county.

State
All of Texas County is in the 142nd district in the Missouri House of Representatives, which is currently represented by  Robert Ross (R-Yukon).

All of Texas County is a part of Missouri's 33rd District in the Missouri Senate and is currently represented by Mike Cunningham (R-Rogersville).

Federal

Texas County is included in Missouri's 8th Congressional District and is currently represented by Jason T. Smith (R-Salem) in the U.S. House of Representatives. Smith won a special election on Tuesday, June 4, 2013, to finish out the remaining term of U.S. Representative Jo Ann Emerson (R-Cape Girardeau). Emerson announced her resignation a month after being reelected with over 70 percent of the vote in the district. She resigned to become CEO of the National Rural Electric Cooperative.

Political culture

At the presidential level, Texas County is Republican-leaning. George W. Bush carried Texas County by two-to-one margins in 2000 and 2004. Bill Clinton was the last Democratic presidential nominee to carry Texas County, in 1992, and like many of the rural counties throughout Missouri, Texas County strongly favored John McCain over Barack Obama in 2008.

Like most rural areas throughout Southeast Missouri, voters in Texas County generally adhere to socially and culturally conservative principles which tend to influence their Republican leanings. In 2004, Missourians voted on a constitutional amendment to define marriage as the union between a man and a woman—it overwhelmingly passed Texas County with 85.63 percent of the vote. The initiative passed the state with 71 percent of support from voters as Missouri became the first state to ban same-sex marriage. In 2006, Missourians voted on a constitutional amendment to fund and legalize embryonic stem cell research in the state—it failed in Texas County with 61.13 percent voting against the measure. The initiative narrowly passed the state with 51 percent of support from voters as Missouri became one of the first states in the nation to approve embryonic stem cell research. Despite Texas County's longstanding tradition of supporting socially conservative platforms, voters in the county have a penchant for advancing populist causes like increasing the minimum wage. In 2006, Missourians voted on a proposition (Proposition B) to increase the minimum wage in the state to $6.50 an hour—it passed Texas County with 72.03 percent of the vote. The proposition strongly passed every single county in Missouri with 78.99 percent voting in favor as the minimum wage was increased to $6.50 an hour in the state. During the same election, voters in five other states also strongly approved increases in the minimum wage.

Missouri presidential preference primary (2008)

In the 2008 presidential primary, voters in Texas County from both political parties supported candidates who finished in second place in the state at large and nationally.

Former U.S. Senator Hillary Clinton (D-New York) received more votes, a total of 1,858, than any candidate from either party in Texas County during the 2008 presidential primary.

Education
Of adults 25 years of age and older in Texas County, 71.4% possesses a high school diploma or higher while 10.8% hold a bachelor's degree or higher as their highest educational attainment.

Public schools
 Cabool R-IV School District – Cabool
 Cabool Elementary School (PK–4)
 Cabool Middle School (5–8)
 Cabool High School (9–12)
 Houston R-I School District – Houston
 Houston Elementary School (PK–5)
 Houston Middle School (6–8)
 Houston High School (9–12)
 Licking R-VIII School District – Licking
 Licking Elementary School (PK–6)
 Licking High School (7–12)
 Plato R-V School District – Plato
 Plato Elementary School (PK–5)
 Plato High School (6–12)
 Raymondville R-VII School District – Raymondville
 Raymondville Elementary School (PK–8)
 Success R-VI School District – Success
 Success Elementary School (K–8)
 Summersville R-II School District – Summersville
 Summersville Elementary School (K–6)
 Summersville High School (7–12)

Private schools
 Wellspring Christian School – Houston – (5–8) – Non-denominational Christian

Alternative and vocational schools
 Exceptional Child Cooperative – Houston – (K–12) – Special Education
 Gentry Residential Treatment Facility – Cabool (6–12) – Alternative

Public libraries
Texas County Library

Communities

Cities

Cabool
Houston (county seat)
Licking
Mountain Grove (partly in Wright County)
Summersville (partly in Shannon County)

Villages
Plato
Raymondville

Unincorporated communities

Alice
Arroll
Ashley Creek
Bado
Bendavis
Big Creek
Bucyrus
Clara
Clear Springs
Dent
Dunn
Dykes
Elk Creek
Ellis Prairie
Ellsworth
Eunice
Evening Shade
Fowler
Guild
Hartshorn
Huggins
Kimble
Kinderpost
Ladd
Lundy
Mahan
Maples
Mitchells Corner
Nile
Oscar
Pleasant Ridge
Prescott
Roby
Samoa
Sargent
Sherrill
Simmons
Solo
Stultz
Success
Tyrone
Upton
Vada
Varvol
Venable
Yukon

Notable people
Kenneth Lay -  Founder, CEO and Chairman of Enron Corporation
Claire McCaskill - US Senator from Missouri
Emmett Kelly -  Circus performer
Orville Tuttle - American Football Player (Professional) from Licking, Missouri

See also
National Register of Historic Places listings in Texas County, Missouri

References

Further reading
 History of Laclede, Camden, Dallas, Webster, Wright, Texas, Pulaski, Phelps, and Dent counties, Missouri (1889) full text

External links
 Digitized 1930 Plat Book of Texas County  from University of Missouri Division of Special Collections, Archives, and Rare Books

 
Missouri placenames of Native American origin
1845 establishments in Missouri
Populated places established in 1845